is a 2012 Japanese anime television series produced by A-1 Pictures based on the original manga series by Chūya Koyama. The story follows a man named Mutta Nanba who one day gets the chance to follow his younger brother Hibito and become an astronaut. The series aired in Japan from April 1, 2012 to March 22, 2014 and was also simulcasted on Crunchyroll. The series has been licensed by Sentai Filmworks in North America.

Episode list

1st year

2nd year

Music listing

Sixteen pieces of theme music were used; eight opening themes and eight ending themes.

References

Space Brothers